The 2012 Waterford Senior Hurling Championship was the 112th staging of the Waterford Senior Hurling Championship since its establishment by the Waterford County Board in 1897.

Ballygunner were the defending champions.

On 14 October 2012, De La Salle won the championship after a 1-21 to 0-12 defeat of Dungarvan in the final. This was their third championship title overall and their first title since 2010. It remains their last championship victory.

Results

Final

References

Waterford Senior Hurling Championship
Waterford Senior Hurling Championship